The 2020 ADAC GT4 Germany season is the second season of the ADAC GT4 Germany, a sports car championship created and organised by the ADAC. The season will begin on 15 August at the Nürburgring and will end on 29 September at Oschersleben after six double-header meetings.

Entry list

Race calendar and results
On 24 May 2020, the ADAC announced a revised 2020 calendar.

Championship standings
Scoring system
Championship points are awarded for the first fifteen positions in each race. Entries are required to complete 75% of the winning car's race distance in order to be classified and earn points. Individual drivers are required to participate for a minimum of 25 minutes in order to earn championship points in any race.

Drivers' championships

Overall

Teams' championship

See also
2020 GT4 European Series
2020 ADAC GT Masters
2020 French GT4 Cup

Notes

References

External links

ADAC GT4 Germany